Gilla Aenghus Ua Chlúmháin (died 1143) was an Irish poet.

Gilla Aenghus Ua Chlúmháin, ollamh of Connacht in poetry, who died in 1143.

No surviving poems by him are known to still exist, except perhaps anonymously. A later bearer of the name, who died in 1438, is listed as O'Clumain, Chief Poet to O'Hara, a Chief of the Name in County Sligo. The name was later rendered as Ó Chlúmháin and Cloonan.

His son, Aindileas Ua Chlúmháin, was chief poet of Connacht upon his death in 1170.

External links
 http://www.ucc.ie/celt/published/T100005B/

References

 The Surnames of Ireland, Edward MacLysaght, 1978.
 The Life, Legends and Legacy of Saint Kerrill, Joseph Mannion, p. 93, 2004. 

People from County Galway
Medieval Irish poets
12th-century Irish writers
1143 deaths
12th-century Irish poets
Year of birth unknown
Irish male poets